Oleksandr Doroshenko (born 1 September 1981) is a Paralympian athlete from Ukraine competing mainly in category F38 throwing events.

Olexandr competed in the 2004 Summer Paralympics winning gold in both the F38 shot put and discus and a bronze in the combined F36/38 javelin.

References

Paralympic athletes of Ukraine
Athletes (track and field) at the 2004 Summer Paralympics
Athletes (track and field) at the 2012 Summer Paralympics
Paralympic gold medalists for Ukraine
Paralympic bronze medalists for Ukraine
Living people
1981 births
Sportspeople from Luhansk
Ukrainian male javelin throwers
Ukrainian male shot putters
Ukrainian male discus throwers
Medalists at the 2004 Summer Paralympics
Paralympic medalists in athletics (track and field)
Athletes (track and field) at the 2020 Summer Paralympics